(Theseus) is an opera by the French composer Jean-Joseph de Mondonville, first performed at the Palace of Fontainebleau on 7 November 1765. It takes the form of a tragédie en musique in five acts. The opera is a new setting of a libretto by Philippe Quinault, originally set by Jean-Baptiste Lully in 1675. Mondonville's version was not a success and did not get to enjoy its public premiere at the Paris Opera until 13 January 1767, but audience rejected it calling for the restoration of Lully's original music. Mondonville's opera was withdrawn for good after its fourth performance.

Roles

References
Notes

Sources
 Original 1765 libretto on Google Books
 Spire Pitou, The Paris Opéra. An Encyclopedia of Operas, Ballets, Composers, and Performers – Rococo and Romantic, 1715-1815, Westport/London, Greenwood Press, 1985, page 521. 
 The Viking Opera Guide, ed. Amanda Holden (Viking, 1993), page 671.

Operas
French-language operas
Tragédies en musique
Operas by Jean-Joseph Cassanéa de Mondonville
1765 operas